Oncidium marshallianum is a species of orchid endemic to southeastern Brazil.

References

External links 

marshallianum
Endemic orchids of Brazil